In the United States a Certified Mortgage Consultant is the most advanced designation for mortgage professionals who are members of the National Association of Mortgage Brokers.

There are 3 levels of official NAMB Certification: Certified Mortgage Consultant or CMC, Certified Residential Mortgage Specialist or CRMS and General Mortgage Associate or GMA. NAMB certified mortgage professionals pledge to adhere to a strict code of ethics and best business practices, and they have proven their skill by meeting tough eligibility requirements and passing a rigorous exam. As the economy and the mortgage industry change, NAMB Certified mortgage professionals maintain their industry expertise by satisfying NAMB's continuing-education requirements.
 The CMC designation is NAMB's most advanced certification. It requires at least 5 years industry experience as well as superior knowledge of residential  and commercial financing. Candidates must pass a background check as well as a 200 question exam.
 The CRMS designation requires at least 2 years industry experience and superior knowledge of residential financing.
 The GMA designation requires proven knowledge of residential financing.

External links
 Current NAMB Certified Mortgage Consultants

Mortgage industry of the United States
Professional certification in finance